mcast.net is a second level domain reserved by the Internet Assigned Numbers Authority (IANA) and maintained by Verisign used to bind DNS records unique to  multicast addressing. The domain and its subdomains are not associated with any web site.

In 2011 it was proposed to make it flow into the domain .arpa without having found success.

Examples
Examples of multicast address definitions in the domain mcast.net are:

See also 
 Multicast
 .net

References

Domain Name System
Second-level domains